The 1996 Korean FA Cup was the first edition of the Korean FA Cup.

Bracket

Round of 16

Quarter-finals

Semi-finals

Final

Awards
Source:

See also
1996 in South Korean football
1996 K League
1996 Korean League Cup

References

External links
Official website
Fixtures & Results at KFA

1996
1996 in South Korean football
1996 domestic association football cups